Nobody's Angel was an American girl band of the late 1990s and early 2000s.

Nobody's Angel may also refer to:

 Nobody's Angel (Nobody's Angel album)
 Nobody's Angel (Crystal Gayle album)
 "Nobody's Angel" (song), by Crystal Gayle
 Nobody's Angel, a novel by Thomas McGuane